The 2013–14 Evansville Purple Aces men's basketball team represented the University of Evansville during the 2013–14 NCAA Division I men's basketball season. The Purple Aces, led by seventh year head coach Marty Simmons, played their home games at the Ford Center and were members of the Missouri Valley Conference. They finished the season 14–19, 6–12 in MVC play to finish in a tie for eighth place. They advanced to the quarterfinals of the Missouri Valley tournament where they lost to Wichita State.

Roster

Schedule

|-
!colspan=9 style="background:#5C2F83; color:#FF5100;"| Exhibition

|-
!colspan=9 style="background:#5C2F83; color:#FF5100;"| Regular season

 

|-
!colspan=9 style="background:#5C2F83; color:#FF5100;"| 2014 Missouri Valley tournament

References

Evansville Purple Aces men's basketball seasons
Evansville
Evans
Evans